A Golden Rainbow is a 1915 American silent short film directed by Tom Ricketts, and starring Perry Banks, Louise Lester, Harry von Meter, and Jack Richardson.

External links

1915 films
American silent short films
American black-and-white films
Films directed by Tom Ricketts
1910s American films